Neil Leon Rudenstine (born January 21, 1935) is an American scholar, educator, and administrator. He served as president of Harvard University from 1991 to 2001.

Early life and education
Rudenstine was born in Danbury, Connecticut, the son of Mae (née Esperito) and Harry Rudenstine, a prison guard. His father was a Ukrainian Jew who emigrated from Kyiv, his mother a Roman Catholic and the daughter of immigrants from Campobasso, Italy.

Rudenstine was raised as a Roman Catholic and grew up speaking Italian with his mother’s family. Later in life, he said, he began to understand more about his Jewish heritage. He also pointed out that he had attended an Episcopalian boarding school and a university with Presbyterian roots. "One way or another, I’ve become extremely ecumenical", he said. He attended the Wooster School in Danbury on a scholarship and was selected to participate in Camp Rising Sun, the Louis August Jonas Foundation's international summer scholarship program.

Rudenstine graduated with an A.B. in English from Princeton University in 1956 after completing his senior thesis, "The Burden of Poetry: A Study in the Art of John Keats, Matthew Arnold and Thomas Stearns Eliot". At Princeton, he participated in Army R.O.T.C. After serving in the U.S. Army as an artillery officer, he attended New College, University of Oxford, on a Rhodes Scholarship and earned an M.A. In 1964, Rudenstine received a Ph.D. in English literature from Harvard; his dissertation, Sir Philip Sidney: The Styles of Love, directed by Douglas Bush, treated Sidney's poetic development.

Career
Most of Rudenstine's career has been dedicated to educational administration. He taught at Harvard from 1964 to 1968 as an instructor and then assistant professor in the Department of English and American Literature and Language.

From 1968 to 1988, Rudenstine was a faculty member and senior administrator at Princeton. A scholar of Renaissance literature, he was an associate professor and then full professor of English. He also held a series of administrative posts at Princeton:
 Dean of students (1968–1972)
 Dean of the college (1972–1977)
 Provost (1977–1988)
After his time at Princeton, he served as executive vice-president of the Andrew W. Mellon Foundation from 1988 to 1991.

President of Harvard
Rudenstine served as president of Harvard from 1991 to 2001. He gained a reputation as an effective fundraiser, overseeing a period of highly successful growth in Harvard's endowment.

Rudenstine led Harvard's first university-wide fundraising campaign in modern history, raising more than $2.6 billion, surpassing the goal of $2.1 billion. With the funds, Harvard increased student financial aid, supported new educational and research programs, and allowed for the creation of new buildings, as well as renovation of existing spaces. Rudenstine's tenure at Harvard also oversaw an endowment growth of $4.7 billion in 1991 to more than $15 billion.

Rudenstine was a strong supporter of university-based research during his presidency as he helped to institute the Science Coalition in the mid-1990s and oversaw the university's federally sponsored research support grow to about $320 million in 2000 from $200 million in 1991.

During his tenure, Rudenstine worked extensively to bring together Harvard’s diverse schools in a way that prompted more effective collaboration. To cultivate inter-school unity, Rudenstine developed many interdisciplinary programs such as the Mind, Brain and Behavior Interfaculty Initiative, the University Committee on the Environment, and the David Rockefeller Center for Latin American Studies. He reorganized the university’s administrative structure so that the school deans worked also as a consultative cabinet, and he recreated the provost position to oversee the interfaculty initiatives created during his presidency.

Rudenstine’s leadership oversaw the establishment of the Radcliffe Institute for Advanced Study, which merged Radcliffe College with Harvard. Its creation was successful and ambitious as it created a community of faculty and fellows across a wide span of the arts and sciences, as well as a specific commitment to the study of women, gender, and society. At the time the Dean of Radcliffe Institute of Advanced Study, Drew Faust said of Rudenstine, “He made it possible and continues to offer me and the Institute support in ways too varied to enumerate. The Institute would not exist without him”.

Rudenstine was a staunch advocate of universities viewing race and ethnicity as one of many factors in the admissions process and advocated extensively on the importance of a diverse student body. In April 2000 during the thirtieth-anniversary celebration of the Department of Afro-American Studies, he stated, “Harvard will continue to take ethnicity and race into account, along with many other factors, as it admits students”.Rudenstine also was committed to providing increased financial aid and scholarships to students from a range of financial circumstances. Student scholarships and fellowship grants increased from $59 million in 1991 to $132 million in 2000, a year before his departure from the presidency.

He was known as a very mild-mannered president, supporting the arts and humanities and generally avoiding internal controversy, usually taking a hands-off approach to leading the university. He is also known for his initially hostile response to the Harvard Living Wage Campaign of 1998–2001, an initiative that drew the active support of thousands of students, faculty, and alumni, including the late Senator Ted Kennedy. Some of Rudenstine’s frustration stemmed from a sit-in organized by students and alumni, which occupied administrative offices, including his, for more than two weeks, slowing University business. Listening to the community, Rudenstine formed an Ad Hoc Committee on Employment Policies at Harvard, which surveyed employment practices and delivered a report to the President. The committee cited the university’s strong record as an employer and recommended additional measures to build on the University’s offerings for employees, which Rudenstine endorsed and advocated for during the remainder of his tenure. 

In November 1994, the University announced that Rudenstine would take a medical leave of absence on the advice of doctors, who noted that he was suffering from severe fatigue and exhaustion. At the time, Rudenstine described the decision to take a leave as one he made with “the greatest reluctance.” He took a three-month leave of absence, during which provost Albert Carnesale served as acting president. Rudenstine returned from his absence in February 1994 and went on to serve seven more years until stepping down in 2001.

Retirement
Rudenstine now chairs the Advisory Board for ARTstor and teaches a yearly freshman seminar in 20th-century poetry at Harvard.

Bibliography
 Pointing Our Thoughts: Reflections on Harvard and Higher Education, 1991–2001 (2001)
 The House of Barnes: The Man, the Collection, the Controversy (2012)
 Ideas of Order: A Close Reading of Shakespeare's Sonnets (2014)

Memberships and affiliations
Rudenstine is an honorary Fellow of New College, Oxford and Emmanuel College, University of Cambridge, and Provost Emeritus at Princeton University. In 1998, as president of Harvard University, Rudenstine was awarded an honorary degree by the University of Oxford, in a ceremony in which the president of Yale University, Richard Levin, was also honored.

Rudenstine is also a Fellow of the American Academy of Arts and Sciences, a former director of the American Council on Education, and a member of the Council on Foreign Relations, the American Philosophical Society, and the Committee for Economic Development.

Rudenstine has been a member of various advisory groups, including the National Commission on Preservation and Access and the Council on Library Resources. He has also served as a trustee of the College Entrance Examination Board and the Wooster School, of which he is a graduate. He serves on the boards of the New York Public Library, the Goldman Sachs Foundation, the Barnes Foundation, and many others in the United States and in Europe.

Personal life
Rudenstine is married to Angelica Zander, an art historian. They have three children and four grandchildren.

References

External links

1935 births
Alumni of New College, Oxford
American Episcopalians
American people of Italian descent
American people of Ukrainian-Jewish descent
People of Molisan descent
American Rhodes Scholars
Camp Rising Sun alumni
Fellows of New College, Oxford
Harvard University alumni
Living people
People from Danbury, Connecticut
Presidents of Harvard University
Princeton University alumni
Princeton University faculty
Members of the American Philosophical Society